Konaseema district, officially known as Dr B. R. Ambedkar Konaseema district, is a district in Coastal Andhra between the tributaries of the Godavari river in the Konaseema region in the Indian state of Andhra Pradesh. It was carved out of East Godavari district on 4 April 2022 by the Andhra Pradesh government. Amalapuram is the district headquarters and the largest city in this district. Other significant towns in the district are Mandapeta, Ramachandrapuram, and Mummidivaram.

Geography 
Konaseema is located in the delta of the Godavari river. The economy is based mainly on agriculture, primarily rice production. There are some Mangrove forests in the northeast of the district. It lies in between the two branches of the Godavari river. The Godavari divides into two components (i.e. Gautami and Vasishtha) and forms an island previously called Nagaram during the Mughal era. The land here is considered very fertile and suitable for agriculture.

This district is surrounded to the north by East Godavari district, south by the Bay of Bengal, east by Kakinada district and west by West Godavari district.

Administrative divisions 

The district has three revenue divisions, namely Amalapuram, Kothapeta and Ramachandrapuram, each headed by a sub-collector. These revenue divisions are then divided into 22 mandals. The district has one municipal corporation in the town of Amalapuram.

Mandals 
There are 10 mandals in the Amalapuram revenue division, 7 in the Kothapeta revenue division and 5 in the Ramachandrapuram revenue division. The 22 mandals under their revenue divisions are listed below:

Cities and towns

Politics 

There are one parliamentary and seven assembly constituencies in the Konaseema district. The parliamentary constituency is Amalapuram (Lok Sabha constituency). The assembly constituencies are listed below

Demographics 

At the time of the 2011 census, Konaseema district had a population of 1,719,093, of which 164,421 (9.56%) lived in urban areas. Konaseema district had a sex ratio of 994 females per 1000 males. Scheduled Castes and Scheduled Tribes comprised 427,130 (24.85%) and 13,481 (0.78%).

Telugu is the predominant language, spoken by 99.11% of the population.

Culture 
The region has a diverse folk culture. In the heart of the Godavari Delta, Konaseema is one of the only two regions in India, apart from Kerala, where a large community still practices traditional Shrauta rituals. These traditions have largely fallen out of use in the rest of India, making it a favoured destination for scholars seeking to understand ancient Vedic culture.

The villagers also have a varied folk culture with their regional gods. Most of the Dalits, like in most of Coastal Andhra, are Christians - both Catholic and Protestant.

Transportation 
National Highway NH216 connects Konaseema District. Andhra Pradesh public state transport operates APSRTC bus services from the district headquarters Amalapuram to Rajahmundry, Razole, Kakinada, Annavaram, Visakhapatnam, Ravulapalem, Tanuku, Eluru, Palakollu, Tuni, Hyderabad, Vijayawada, Srikakulam, Tekkali, Ichapuram, Vizianagaram, Narsapuram, Bhimavaram, Machilipatnam, Srisailam, Guntur and Tirupati.

Nearest railway stations 

Rajahmundry railway station, Palakollu railway station, Narsapuram railway station, Bhimavaram Junction railway station, and Bhimavaram Town Halt railway station are the nearest railway stations.

Proposed railway line 

The Kakinada - Kotipalli - Narsapur railway line is under construction, and a bridge over the Godavari river is being constructed. Once operational, this railway will also make a stop at Amalapuram.

See also 
 Konaseema district protest

References 

Districts of Andhra Pradesh
2022 establishments in Andhra Pradesh